Røa IL is a Norwegian sports club from Røa in the borough of Vestre Aker, Oslo. It was founded on 11 November 1900, and has sections for football, gymnastics, bandy, and cross-country skiing. Football, bandy, and Nordic skiing have been dominant in Røa. In bandy, the team has twice made it to the finals in the Norwegian cup, losing both to arch-rivals Stabæk. In skiing, the two foremost names are Olav Hansson, world champion team large hill ski jumping in the 1982 World Ski Championships and Martin Johnsrud Sundby, a Norwegian national team cross-country skier who won the FIS Cross-Country World Cup and the Tour de Ski in 2013–14.

The biggest success so far is probably the women's football team. While Røa was open for women participating in handball and gymnastics, football was frowned upon for quite some time. Women's football was started outside the club by Røa legend Ole Bjørn Edner and his daughter Kristine with friends. The team was finally recognized when they started winning the Norway Cup in 1993. The team started in the fourth tier in 1994, and spent two years in each tier before they qualified for the first tier, Toppserien, in 2000. As the bandy team were relegated the same season, the football team took over as the main success. In an attempt to brand the team, a former bandy player came up with the nickname "Dynamite Girls", which has stuck since.

Røa's first season in Toppserien was a fierce battle to avoid relegation. In the last match the team saw it through. The next two seasons were a dramatic improvement, the team finished fourth (out of ten) both times. In 2004 Røa won both league and cup. After an abysmal 2005 season, they continued their dominance with a cup victory in 2006, a league victory in 2007, and a Double in 2008 and 2009. With in all eight trophies, Røa is the third most successful team in women's football in Norway (joint with Sprint-Jeløy if one counts the proto-national league from 1984.1986).

The team has a host of current and former national team players. Among them are the 2007 World Cup players Siri Nordby (captain), Guro Knutsen Mienna, Lene Mykjåland, Marie Knutsen and Marit Fiane Christensen.

The men's football team currently plays in the Third Division (fourth tier).

List of seasons 

Source:

First team squad

European history
Røa has participated in five seasons of UEFA competitions with their best result reaching the quarter-finals in 2009/10 losing in those to Turbine Potsdam, the eventual champion.

UEFA Women's Cup
2005/06: First qualifying round
2008/09: Second qualifying round
UEFA Women's Champions League
2009/10: Quarter-finals
2010/11: Round of 16
2012/13: Round of 16

References

External links 
 Official site - women's football
 Official site - men's football
 Røa Kunstgress - Nordic Stadiums

Football clubs in Oslo
Bandy clubs in Norway
Sport in Oslo
Association football clubs established in 1900
Bandy clubs established in 1900
1900 establishments in Norway
Women's football clubs in Norway